Segara Anak is a crater lake in the caldera that formed during the explosive volcanic eruption of Mount Samalas in 1257. The caldera is next to Mount Rinjani on Lombok Island in Indonesia. "Segara Anak" means "child of the sea" and refers to the blue lake's resemblance to the sea. The volcanic cone Gunung Barujari is at the eastern end of the lake and is responsible for its crescent shape. Hot magma below the lake is responsible for this anomaly. Gas bubbles escape from the lake floor, helping the lake to have a pH of 7-8.

The peak of Gunung Baru Jari is  AMSL.

Fish breeding 
There were no fish in Segara Anak. In 1969, volcanologists from the Geological Society of London examined the lake and recommended the cultivation of fish. In 1985, the Nusa Tenggara Barat provincial government began breeding fish in the lake. The fish bred rapidly and the lake became home to millions of tilapia and carp. Segara Anak is today a popular spot for fishing, and some locals make a living from this.

Mount Samalas

The eruption was one of the largest during the last few thousand years, with a probable Volcanic Explosivity Index of 7. The eruption may have been the cause of decreased global temperatures for a few years and may have even been a triggering factor for the Little Ice Age.

References

Segara Anak
Segara Anak
Landforms of Lombok
Landforms of West Nusa Tenggara